Michael Henry Sheridan (July 8, 1912 – August 23, 1976) was a United States district judge of the United States District Court for the Middle District of Pennsylvania.

Education and career

Sheridan was born in Nanticoke, Pennsylvania, Sheridan received a Bachelor of Science degree from Lafayette College in 1933. He received a Bachelor of Laws from Dickinson School of Law (now Penn State Dickinson Law) in 1936. He entered private practice from 1937 to 1942. He was in the United States Navy from 1942 to 1947. He was an Assistant United States Attorney of the District of Columbia in Washington, D.C. in 1947. He returned to private practice from 1948 to 1961.

Federal judicial service

Sheridan was nominated by President John F. Kennedy on August 15, 1961, to the United States District Court for the Middle District of Pennsylvania, to a new seat created by 75 Stat. 80. He was confirmed by the United States Senate on August 30, 1961, and received his commission the same day. He served as Chief Judge from 1962 to 1976. and as a member of the Judicial Conference of the United States from 1972 to 1975. His service was terminated on August 23, 1976, due to his death at his residence at the Westmoreland Club in Wilkes-Barre, Pennsylvania.

References

Sources
 

1912 births
1976 deaths
People from Nanticoke, Pennsylvania
Military personnel from Pennsylvania
Judges of the United States District Court for the Middle District of Pennsylvania
United States district court judges appointed by John F. Kennedy
20th-century American judges
Lafayette College alumni
United States Navy personnel of World War II
Assistant United States Attorneys